Basket Ravenna Piero Manetti, also known as Orasì Ravenna (after its title sponsor), is a Serie A2 Basket Italian basketball team based in Ravenna, Emilia-Romagna. Its colors are red and yellow and they are commonly referred as Leoni Bizantini (Byzantine Lions) because of the coat of arms of the city.

History
Originally founded in 1984 and named Basket Ravenna Piero Manetti, it gained access to "Divisione Nazionale A Silver" during the 2012-2013 season. In the very same year, Basket Ravenna won its first cup, the Coppa Italia DNB.  
During the 2016-2017 Serie A2 Basket season, the team, guided by coach Antimo Martino, ends the regular season in 4th position and consequentially enters -for the first time in its history- the playoff. 
At the first round, the team overcomes Virtus Roma in a tough series won 3-1.
At the quarter finals, again Basket Ravenna successes against Scaligera Basket Verona in a hostile arena, winning the series for 3-0.

The winning strike ends in semi-finals by the hands of the Virtus Bologna (that lately will win the playoff, reaching Lega Basket Serie A.

During the 2017-2018 Serie A2 Basket season, Antimo Martino leads the team to the Coppa Italia finals, but fails to reach the playoff, ending the season in 9th place.

In June 2018, president Roberto Vianello announces Andrea Mazzon as the new head coach and Julio Trovato as the new general manager.

Colors and symbol
Team colors are red and yellow. Home shirt is completely white with red collar, while the away shirt is completely red.

Arena
Basket Ravenna Piero Manetti used to play its home matches in the PalaCosta in Ravenna until 2014-2015 season, when society chose the more capacious Pala De André.

Chronicle

2017-2018 roster

Depth chart

Updated to August 25th 2017.

Staff

Notable players

Adam Smith (born 1992), basketball player for Hapoel Holon in the Israel Basketball Premier League

References

External links
 Basket Ravenna - Official site

Basketball teams in Emilia-Romagna
Basketball teams established in 1984
Ravenna